Peter Metro (born Peter Clarke, Kingston, Jamaica, c.1960) is a reggae deejay, who released five albums in the 1980s.

Biography
Initially performing under the name Peter Ranking, he changed his name when he discovered that another deejay was using that name, and since he was resident deejay on the Metromedia sound system, he chose the name Peter Metro. His use of Spanish gained him many fans in South America, and he is acknowledged as the first multilingual reggae toaster. His work with Yellowman and Fathead on the albums Yellowman, Fathead, and the one Peter Metro (1982) and Live With Yellowman and Sassafrass (1984) kept his profile high through to the mid-1980s. He appeared at the Reggae Sunsplash festival in 1987 with English deejay Dominic, captured on the Reggae Sunsplash Dancehall X '87 video. In 1989, he appeared as a guest on the CD Bora Bora by the Brazilian rock band Os Paralamas do Sucesso. He performed the song "The Can" and "Don't Give Me That", the latter one being an anti-cocaine statement which made reference to Richard Pryor's mishap with crack in 1980.

Albums
Yellowman, Fathead & The One Peter Metro (1982) Abissa
Sinbad & the Metric System (1983) CSA (Peter Metro & Captain Sinbad With Little John)
Dedicated to You (1984) CSA (with Yellowman, Lady Anne, and Squiddly Ranking)
Live with Yellowman and Sassafrass (1984)
No Problem (1985) Power House
The D.J. Don (1986) Black Solidarity

References

External links
Peter Metro at Roots Archives
More Peter Metro information.

1960 births
Living people
Musicians from Kingston, Jamaica
Jamaican reggae musicians
Jamaican dancehall musicians
Jamaican songwriters